Gary Turner is a sideshow performer. He holds the current Guinness World Record for the stretchiest skin, caused by a serious form of Ehlers Danlos syndrome. On October 29, 1999, in Los Angeles, he stretched the skin on his abdomen to a total length of 6.25 inches (15.8 cm), earning him the record. He performed in the short film He Took His Skin Off For Me. He also appeared in an episode of Ripley's Believe It or Not!

References 

1971 births
Living people
Sideshow performers
World record holders